The 1930 Victorian Football League (VFL) season was the 34th season of the VFL. The season saw 135 Australian rules footballers make their senior VFL debut and a further 19 players transfer to new clubs having previously played in the VFL.

Summary

Debuts

References

Victorian Football League
Australian rules football records and statistics
Australian rules football-related lists
1930 in Australian rules football